The 1908 Franklin Baptists football team represented the Franklin College of Indiana during the 1908 college football season.  The Baptists lost a school record nine games (the record was tied in 1992 with another 0–9–1 season), and scored a combined 19 points, compared to their opponent's combined total of 263.

Schedule

References

Franklin
Franklin Grizzlies football seasons
Franklin Baptists football